Dave Haslam is a British writer, broadcaster and DJ who DJ'ed over 450 times at the Haçienda nightclub in Manchester and has since DJ'ed worldwide. He has written for the New Musical Express, The Guardian, the London Review of Books, and The Times, and has published five books.

Life and career
Originally from Moseley, Birmingham, and educated at King Edward's School, Birmingham, Haslam moved to Manchester in 1980, and later graduated from the University of Manchester after which he worked as a concert promoter, hosting live performances by Sonic Youth, Big Black, Primal Scream, the Stone Roses, and others, and began DJing at clubs including the Man Alive and the Venue. In the mid-1980s, he founded the fanzine Debris and wrote for the New Musical Express. He also ran a music label called Play Hard Records signing bands such as King of the Slums, The Bodines and The Train Set.

From May 1986 he was a DJ at the Haçienda nightclub, including a residency at Thursday's Temperance club night until October 1990. In the 1990s he also hosted the weekly night Yellow at the Boardwalk nightclub in Manchester.

In 1999 he published a book about the Manchester music scene (Manchester, England), and, subsequently, books about superstar DJs called Adventures on the Wheels of Steel, the music and politics of the 1970s called Not Abba; the Real Story of the 1970s (reprinted as Young Hearts Run Free; the Real Story of the 1970s), and Life After Dark; A History of British Nightclubs & Music Venues.

In May 2018, his autobiography was published. Sonic Youth Slept On My Floor: Music, Manchester & More was described by Victoria Segal in The Sunday Times, as "Smart... beautifully written...utterly endearing". In December 2018 it was acclaimed a 'Book of the Year' by DJ and broadcaster Gilles Peterson.

His other cultural activities included creating an installation for the Berlin-based 'Shrinking Cities' exhibition; presenting a twenty-minute talk on the North/South divide for BBC Radio 3; appearing on TV shows on BBC Two (including the series The Seven Ages of Rock, 2007,) and on Channel 4, Granada TV, and Canal Plus (France); and, for two years, hosting a weekly music show on XFM.

In 2009, he created the 'Close Up' series of live onstage interviews. He has since conducted onstage interviews with guests including Jeremy Deller, writers Will Self, Jackie Kay, Michael Chabon, and Jonathan Franzen, musicians Terry Hall, Edwyn Collins, Kevin Rowland, Jarvis Cocker, Nile Rodgers and John Lydon. In January 2014 he hosted his first 'Close Up' interview in Paris, which took place at Silencio and featured Laurent Garnier. He returned to Silencio in October 2014 to interview the disco pioneer Marc Cerrone.

His DJ history includes touring with The Stone Roses, aftershow parties for New Order, Depeche Mode, Gorillaz, and the Charlatans, and gigs in Chicago, Cleveland, Detroit, Berlin, Paris, Reykjavik, Ibiza, Lima, and Geneva. He currently holds an infrequent guest-only night, 'Sweet Sensation' at various venues in Manchester.

He has taught music journalism at the University of Salford, and lectured at Manchester Metropolitan University in the School of Art.

In 2012, he co-curated the exhibition 'Dreams Without Frontiers' at the Manchester Art Gallery.

In 2017 he co-curated 'So It Goes' a collaboration between New Order, Liam Gillick, and a 12-piece synthesizer orchestra which was commissioned by Manchester International Festival.

In 2019 he published the first of a series of limited edition "mini-books" - the series is dubbed 'Art Decades'. The subjects of the books includes vinyl record collecting, Keith Haring's relationship with New York nightlife, Courtney Love living in Liverpool in 1982, and the poet Sylvia Plath. The broadcaster James O'Brien has described the 'Art Decades' series as "Lovely editions & beautifully written".

References

External links

1960s births
Living people
Academics of the University of Salford
British DJs
Madchester musicians
People educated at King Edward's School, Birmingham
Alumni of the University of Manchester
People from Moseley